Girolamo Manfredi or Hieronimus de Manfredis (1430–1493) was an Italian philosopher, physician and astronomer.

He lived and worked in Bologna, becoming a notable citizen.

Life 
Born in Bologna in a family of lawyers, he led his studies in his hometown, in Ferrara where he graduated in 1455, and in Parma where he completed his Ph.D. He taught Logic and other disciplines in Bologna for the rest of his life.

He entered the minor orders and he had the tonsure in 1459.

He disputed with Giovanni Pico della Mirandola and worked together with Cola Montano and Galeotto Marzio. Manfredi died in Bologna during the summer of 1493.

He wrote his works both in Latin and vernacular. His most acclaimed book is Liber de homine (Il Perché).

Works

References 

15th-century Italian physicians
15th-century Italian astronomers
15th-century Italian philosophers
Physicians from Bologna